Hopper Tunity Box is a 1977 album by jazz/rock musician Hugh Hopper. Ex-Soft Machine bassist augments his rather infamous fuzz-bass attack by performing on guitar, recorders, soprano sax, and percussion. The album recorded in 1976 and re-released on CD by Culture Press in 1996 and Cuneiform Records in 2007, this outing features the bassist's fellow Soft Machine bandmate, saxophonist Elton Dean, along with others of note.

History

Around 1975 Hugh Hopper begun to gather together musical ideas that he had been working on since leaving Soft Machine in 1973 - snatches of tunes that for the most part had not previously seen the light of day. A friend of him was recording engineer Mike Dunne, who had been assistant engineer on his first solo record, 1984 (CBS, 1973), and who was now in charge of the mobile studio of Jon Anderson of Yes. Mike suggested him to co-produce a record together; he would provide the studio and Hopper would provide the music and musicians.

By the time Hugh Hopper had arranged the music into some sort of coherent order and invited along the various guest musicians, Mike's studio was set up in one of London's big film sound studios, where Yes rehearsed for tours. Jon Anderson occasionally popped his head around the door when they were beavering away at some tricky tape-looping or double-speeded bass, and Steve Howe looked in once, Hopper seem to remember. He knew them slightly, anyway, from Soft Machine tours when the two bands came together at festivals.

Hugh Hopper think they took about two weeks to get most of the music down. For all but one of the tracks, he started by laying down bass with an old-fashioned, wind-up metronome click-track. Definitely a low-tech approach on this one. Then Mike Travis came in and added drums for all of the tracks except "Mobile Mobile", which featured Nigel Morris, Hopper's old bandmate from Isotope. (After the record came out, both drummers said they preferred the sound that the other drummer got down on tape). The only time Hopper actually played alongside any of the other musicians was on "Crumble", when Mike Travis and him laid down the rhythm track together. Then Dave Stewart did his sterling work on the Hammond and weird oscillator sounds. Next Gary Windo with his own special energy and madness, honking sax and blowing foghorns on "Miniluv". Hugh traded him sessions for the bass he had recently played on his "Steam Radio" project, which finally came out many years later as His Masters Bones (Cuneiform Records, 1996). Frank Roberts added some tasty Fender Rhodes piano and, lastly, in came Elton Dean and Marc Charig to play on "The Lonely Sea and the Sky".

Critical reception 
After the record came out on the Norwegian Compendium Records label, it had mostly good reviews... except one in an ultraconservative British jazz magazine, where the reviewer said: "it had all the subtlety of a stone (14 pounds) of King Edwards (potatoes) tumbling downstairs and all the melodic and harmonic interest of a trapped wasp... not a jazz record..."

Track listing 
All pieces were written by Hugh Hopper, except where noted.

Hopper Tunity Box (1974) 
The theme is played by multitracked descant and tenor recorders (about 12 descant and two tenor tracks) over a riff of electric organ, electric piano and double-tracked bass. Double-speed fuzz bass then plays Hopper Tunes and quotes until an alien tune brings in Dave Stewart's weird tone-generators.

Personnel 
 Hugh Hopper - bass, guitar, recorders, soprano sax, percussion
 Richard Brunton - guitar (A2, B1)
 Marc Charig - cornet, tenor horn (A4, B2, B4)
 Elton Dean - alto sax, saxello (A4, B2, B4)
 Nigel Morris - drums (B3)
 Frank Roberts - electric piano (A4, B1, B4)
 Dave Stewart - organ, pianet, oscillators (A1, B3)
 Mike Travis - drums (A1, A2, A3, A4, B1, B4)
 Gary Windo - bass clarinet, saxes (A1, A2, B1, B2)

References 

Hugh Hopper albums
1977 albums